Prasanna Puwanarajah (born 1981) is an English actor, director, writer, and former junior medical doctor.

Early life
Puwanarajah was born at Ipswich Hospital in Suffolk to Eelam Tamil parents from Sri Lanka, his mother a psychiatrist and his father a dentist. He spent his early childhood on Churchill Avenue in Ipswich before the family moved to Hampshire when he was four. He participated in school plays and spent a season with the National Youth Theatre, but thought of acting as more of a hobby than a career choice at the time. He trained in Medicine at New College, Oxford. After working as a junior doctor in reconstructive surgery for over three years, Puwanarajah decided to take a year out. It was during this time he decided to become a full time actor, describing it as "more of a strong pull towards something else" than a "push away from" his medical career.

Personal life
Puwanarajah lives in North West London.

Bibliography

Filmography

Film

Television

Stage

Awards and nominations

References

External links

Living people
1981 births
21st-century English medical doctors
Alumni of New College, Oxford
English graphic novelists
English male actors of South Asian descent
English male Shakespearean actors
English male stage actors
English people of Sri Lankan Tamil descent
English surgeons
English theatre directors
Actors from Ipswich
Male actors from Hampshire
Male actors from Suffolk
National Youth Theatre members